The Petite rivière Bédard is a tributary of the Bédard River, flowing in the municipalities of Larouche (MRC of Le Fjord-du-Saguenay Regional County Municipality) and Hébertville-Station (MRC of Lac-Saint-Jean-Est Regional County Municipality), in the administrative region of Saguenay–Lac-Saint-Jean, in the province of Quebec, in Canada.

The Petite Rivière Bédard valley is served by chemin du rang Saint-Pierre, chemin du Petit rang Saint-Pierre and chemin du rang Saint-Charles, for forestry and agriculture.

Agriculture is the main economic activity in the area of the Petite rivière Bédard; forestry, second.

The surface of the Petite rivière Bédard is usually frozen from the beginning of December to the end of March, however the safe circulation on the ice is generally made from mid-December to mid-March.

Geography 
The main watersheds neighboring the Petite Rivière Bédard are:
 north side: Bédard River, Raquette River, la Petite Décharge (La Grosse Décharge), Saguenay River;
 east side: Bédard River, Cascouia River, Cascouia bay, Kenogami Lake, rivière aux Sables River, Chicoutimi River;
 south side: La Belle Rivière (Lac Saint-Jean), Rivière des Aulnaies, Vert Lake;
 west side: Couchepaganiche East River, La Belle Rivière (Lac Saint-Jean), Rivière des Aulnaies, lac Saint-Jean.

The Petite rivière Bédard rises at an unidentified small lake in the municipality of Larouche. This source is located at:
  west of Cascouia Bay (integrated into Kenogami Lake);
  south-east of the confluence of the Petite Bédard and Bédard rivers;
  south of the Canadian National railway;
  south of route 170;
  south-west of the center of the village of Larouche;
  south of the Saguenay River.

  towards the northwest by forming a curve towards the south, up to a stream (coming from the north);
  westwards, up to a curve of the river;
  north-west, to the mouth of the river.

The course of the Petite Bédard River flows onto the south bank of the Bédard River, in agricultural area. This confluence is located at:
  south-east of the Canadian National railway;
  east of the village center of Hébertville-Station;
  west of Cascouia Bay of Kenogami Lake;
  south-east of downtown Alma;
  south-east of Isle-Maligne dam;
  south-east of the confluence of Lac Saint-Jean and the Saguenay River (ie at the entrance to La Petite Décharge).

Toponymy 
The toponym “petite rivière Bédard” was formalized on August 28, 1980, at the Place Names Bank of the Commission de toponymie du Québec.

Notes and references

Appendices

Related articles 
 Le Fjord-du-Saguenay Regional County Municipality
 Lac-Saint-Jean-Est Regional County Municipality
 Larouche, a municipality
 Bédard River
 Saguenay River
 List of rivers of Quebec

Rivers of Saguenay–Lac-Saint-Jean
Regional county municipalities in Saguenay–Lac-Saint-Jean
Le Fjord-du-Saguenay Regional County Municipality